"Rock Me All Night" is the debut single of Australian dance duo Kaylan. It was released in March 2000 as the first single from their debut album, No Commandments (2000). The song peaked at number 14 on the Australian ARIA Singles Chart.

In an interview in September 2000, the band was asked if they were surprised with the success of the song. They replied, "I think we did really well considering we're a new band, it's hard for people to accept new bands, and especially a track that we've written ourselves."

Critical reception
Brendan Swift of AllMusic (in a review of the album) said; "The opening hit single, "Rock Me All Night" an infectious R&B starter, is light and catchy entertainment".

Track listing
Australian CD single (8573809432)
 "Rock Me All Night" (Extended Mix [with rap]) – 3:59
 "Never Ask for More" – 3:08
 "Rock Me All Night" (Groovallicious Mix) – 5:14
 "Rock Me All Night" (Extended Mix [with rap]) – 4:51
 "Rock Me All Night" (Groove Quantize Mix) – 5:44

Charts

Certifications

References

2000 debut singles
2000 songs
Disco Montego songs